Vrindavan Nagar Bhopal is a suburb of Bhopal, Madhya Pradesh, India.

It is located on Ayodhya bypass road in Bhopal, with Ayodhya Nagar, Piplani and Rajiv Nagar surrounding it. It is situated on one side of Hathaikheda Lake, which gives it a unique and very picturesque location. It is home to number of high-profile residential societies such as Sagar Lake view homes; other housing societies include Kanta Shravan homes, Jeet homes to name a few.

Neighbourhoods in Bhopal